The 2004 United States presidential election in Mississippi took place on November 2, 2004 as part of the 2004 United States presidential election. Voters chose six representatives, or electors to the Electoral College, who voted for president and vice president. It was the first presidential election since the 2000 United States census where Mississippi lost an electoral vote, reducing its elector count from seven to six. Mississippi had the fewest electoral votes since 1848.

Mississippi was won by incumbent President George W. Bush of the Republican Party with a 19.69% margin of victory over Democratic nominee John Kerry. Prior to the election, Mississippi was considered a state Bush would win with ease, or a red state. Mississippi has not voted for a Democrat since 1976, when Jimmy Carter carried the state. Nevertheless, this is the only election since 1988 in which the Democratic nominee has won less than 40% of the state's vote.

As of 2022, this is the last election in which Mississippi voted to the right of Arkansas, Tennessee, or Louisiana.

Campaign

Predictions
12 news organizations made state-by-state predictions of the election. These organizations published their predictions just prior to election day:

Polling
Bush won pre-election polling by a double-digit margin.

Fundraising
Bush raised $866,580. Kerry raised $599,665.

Advertising and visits
Neither campaign spent or visited this state during the fall campaign.

Analysis 
The last Democratic presidential nominee to win Mississippi was fellow Southerner Jimmy Carter in 1976. Due to its reliably conservative voting pattern, neither of the two major party candidates campaigned in the state.

Mississippi is one of the most racially polarized states in presidential elections. Black Mississippians almost uniformly vote Democratic, while white Mississippians vote Republican nearly as consistently. In 2004, 14% of white Mississippians voted for John Kerry and 10% of African Americans voted for Bush. Kerry's main support lay in the western counties on the Delta and next to the Mississippi River. , this is the last election in which Pike County, Copiah County, Oktibbeha County, and Yazoo County voted for the Republican candidate. Bush became the first Republican to win the White House without carrying Jasper County since Ronald Reagan in 1980.

Results

By county

Counties that flipped from Democratic to Republican
Panola (Largest city: Sardis)
Yalobusha (Largest city: Water Valley)

Counties that flipped from Republican to Democratic
Jasper (Largest city: Bay Springs)

By congressional district
Bush won 3 out of Mississippi's 4 congressional districts, including one held by a Democrat.

Electors

Mississippi was assigned 6 electors to cast votes to the Electoral college. Given that Mississippi voted for Bush, all electors were pledged to cast their ballots for Bush. The electors were:
 Kelly Segars
 John Phillips
 Wayne Parker
 Jimmy Creekmore
 Victor Mavar
 Billy Mounger

References 

Mississippi
2004
2004 Mississippi elections